Maarten de Fockert (born 20 February 1995) is a Dutch footballer who plays as a goalkeeper for Derde Divisie club SteDoCo.

External links
 
 Voetbal International profile 

Living people
1995 births
People from Midden-Delfland
Association football goalkeepers
Dutch footballers
SC Heerenveen players
VVV-Venlo players
Go Ahead Eagles players
Excelsior Rotterdam players
SteDoCo players
Eredivisie players
Eerste Divisie players
Derde Divisie players
Footballers from South Holland